John D. Cressler (born 1961) is an American academic and author, currently the Regents Professor and holder of the Schlumberger Chair in Electronics at Georgia Tech.

Early life and education
Cressler was born in 1961 and grew up in Georgia. He received his B.S. in physics from Georgia Tech in 1984, and his Ph.D. in applied physics from Columbia University in 1990. From 1984 to 1992, he was on the research staff at the IBM Thomas J. Watson Research Center, and from 1992 to 2002 he served on faculty at Auburn University. In 2002, he joined the faculty at Georgia Tech, and is currently Schlumberger Chair Professor of Electronics, in the School of Electrical and Computer Engineering.

Research
Cressler's research at Georgia Tech primarily focuses on the advancement of silicon-germanium (SiGe) electronics, with particular application to extreme environments. He has edited and authored various technical works related to SiGe and extreme environment electronics.

Personal life
Cressler married his wife Maria while an undergraduate at Georgia Tech. They have three children.

Publications 
Cressler has authored three books related to SiGe electronics engineering, two works of non-fiction, and two novels.

Technical Non-Fiction 

 Silicon-Germanium Heterojunction Bipolar Transistors, Artech House
 The Silicon Heterostructure Handbook: Materials, Fabrication, Devices, Circuits, and Applications of SiGe and Si Strained-Layer Epitaxy, CRC Press
 Extreme Environment Electronics, CRC Press

Non-Fiction 

 Silicon Earth: Introduction to the Microelectronics and Nanotechnology Revolution, Cambridge University Press
 Reinventing Teenagers: The Gentle Art of Instilling Character in Our Young People, Xlibris (self-published)

Fiction 

 Emeralds of the Alhambra, Sunbury Press
 Shadows in the Shining City, Sunbury Press

References

American non-fiction writers
Living people
1961 births
Writers from Georgia (U.S. state)
Georgia Tech alumni
Columbia School of Engineering and Applied Science alumni
Auburn University faculty
Georgia Tech faculty